Milica Pavlović (born 11 August 1991) is a Swiss-born Serbian singer. She gained fame in 2011-2012 as a contestant on the singing competition show Zvezde Granda. 

Pavlović has to date released four studio albums. She has won several industry awards, including two MAC awards.

Early life
Milica Pavlović was born on August 11, 1991 in Einsiedeln, Switzerland to parents Mirjana and Dragoslav, who divorced soon after. Because her father continued working in Switzerland, she was brought up in the village of Gornji Bunibrod, near Leskovac by her paternal grandparents, Rada and Vladimir Pavlović. In a 2019 interview, Pavlović stated that she had not spoken to her mother in ten years.

Pavlović graduated from the "Stanisav Binički" Music High School in Leskovac and also attended the singing school of Aleksandra Radović.

Career

2010-2019: Career beginnings, Govor tela, Boginja and Zauvek
Pavlović rose to prominence in 2011 as a contestant on the televised singing show Zvezde Granda, where she received particular notice for her stage performance. She managed to reach the season final in 2012, finishing in the 8th place. Upon Zvezde Granda, she was signed to Grand Production, through which she released her first single "Tango" in June 2012. In October the same year, Pavlović also collaborated with folk singer Dejan Matić on the song "Čili". Her debut album Govor tela was released in June 2014 under Grand Production. It was preceded by the singles "Pakleni plan" and "Sexy Senorita" in 2013. Govor tela was sold in two circulations of 30,000 copies.

Her sophomore album Boginja was released in December 2016. It also included previously released standalone singles "Selfie", "Demantujem" (2015), "La Fiesta" and "Ljubi ljubi" (2016). The album featured several stand-out hits, such as "Mogla sam" and "Boginja", while all eleven music videos have collectively accumulated close to 300 million views on YouTube as of June 2022.

In July 2017, Pavlović released the music video for the song "Operisan od ljubavi", which was inspired by the 2000 movie Malèna. In July the following year, she had a duet with Aca Lukas, titled "Kidaš me". On 22 December 2018, Pavlović released her third studio album Zauvek, on which she collaborated with Greek songwriter Phoebus alongside her past collaborators.

2020-present: Posesivna and future projects
In 2021, Pavlović had a lead role on the first season of the television series Pevačica, which aired on Superstar and Pink. 

On 11 April 2022, Pavlović independently released Posesivna under her newly founded label Senorita Music. The album was preceded by three singles in 2021: "Crna jutra (Balkan S&M)", "Oko moje" featuring Saša Matić and "Dabogda propao". Posesivna was sold in 10,000 units. Tracks "Šećeru", "15ica" and "Provereno" debuted on Billboard's Croatian Singles Chart, while the latter song peaked a top of the chart. Later that year, she announced her first solo concert at the Čair Hall in Niš, titled Kraljica juga (Queen of the South). On 11 February 2023, Pavlović held the live show to a sold-out venue.

Other ventures
In 2019, Pavlović became the brand ambassador for German retail brand Deichmann in Serbia and Bosnia and Herzegovina. 

In 2021, she co-founded the fashion brand Rouzhe along with Serbian designer Biljana Tipsarević.

Discography

Studio albums
Govor tela (2014)
Boginja (2016)
Zauvek (2018)
Posesivna (2022)
 Kučketina (2023)

Non-album singles
 Dođi (2010)
 Čili, čili (2012) feat. Dejan Matić
 Status Quo (2020)
 Papi (2020)

Filmography

Awards and nominations

See also
Music of Serbia

References

External links

1991 births
Living people
People from Einsiedeln
Musicians from Leskovac
21st-century Serbian women singers
Grand Production artists
Serbian folk-pop singers